Meir Jacob Kister (‎ 16 January 1914 in Mościska – 16 August 2010 in Jerusalem) was a Jewish Arabist from Poland who worked in Israel.

Kister went to school in Sanok and Przemyśl. In 1932 he began studies in law at the University of Lviv, but in 1933 he moved to Warsaw, where he worked in a publishing house. In 1939 he emigrated to Palestine, where he studied Arabic in the Hebrew University of Jerusalem, among others under David Hartwig Baneth and Shlomo Dov Goitein. In 1945–46 he worked as press secretary of the Polish embassy at Beirut. From 1946 to 1958 he taught Arabic at the Hebrew Reali School in Haifa.

At the same time he continued his studies, achieving an M.A. in 1949 and completed his Ph.D. in 1964. Since 1958 he taught at the Hebrew University, where he was active since 1964 as senior lecturer and from 1970 until his retirement in 1983 as professor. He is among the founders of the Arabic Departments in the universities of Tel Aviv and Haifa.

Since 1975 he was a member of the Israel Academy of Sciences. In 1981 he received the Israel Prize, and in 1988 the Rothschild Prize.

He is the father of biblical scholar Menahem Kister.

References

Sources 
 Biography of Prof. M. J. Kister at Hebrew University of Jerusalem 
 Tottoli, R. (2010). MEIR J. KISTER (1914-2010). Oriente Moderno, 90(2), 299-302

External links 

 Website at Hebrew University of Jerusalem dedicated to Kister's work

1914 births
2010 deaths
Israeli Arabists
People from Lviv Oblast
Hebrew University of Jerusalem alumni
Academic staff of the Hebrew University of Jerusalem
Members of the Israel Academy of Sciences and Humanities
Israel Prize in Middle Eastern studies recipients
Polish emigrants to Mandatory Palestine